Erwin Puschner (5 January 1896 – 30 June 1966) was an Austrian footballer. He played in two matches for the Austria national football team from 1923 to 1924.

References

External links
 

1896 births
1966 deaths
Austrian footballers
Austria international footballers
Place of birth missing
Association footballers not categorized by position